Mariah Cheyenne Bell (born April 18, 1996) is an American former figure skater. She is the 2022 U.S. national champion, 2020 U.S. national silver medalist, and two-time U.S. national bronze medalist (2017, 2019). She is also the 2020 Skate America gold medalist, 2016 Skate America silver medalist, the 2019 Internationaux de France bronze medalist, the 2019 Rostelecom Cup bronze medalist, the 2019 CS Nebelhorn Trophy champion, and the 2016 CS U.S. International Classic silver medalist.

She has finished within the top six at four ISU Championships, with her best result being fourth place at the 2022 World Figure Skating Championships and represented the United States at the 2022 Winter Olympics.

Personal life 
Mariah Bell was born on April 18, 1996, in Tulsa, Oklahoma. She is the second child of Kendra and Andy Bell. Her older sister, Morgan, has skated with Disney on Ice.

At age 12, Bell moved with her mother and sister from Houston to Westminster, Colorado. She graduated from Ralston Valley High School in 2014, and was named the school's Super Senior.

Career

Early years 
Bell began skating at the age of four because of her sister. Early in her career; she was coached by Megan Faulkner, Billy Schneider, and Candy Brown. At age 12, she joined Cindy Sullivan in Westminster, Colorado.

Bell finished fifth in the junior division at the 2012 U.S. Championships. She was assigned to the 2012 Gardena Spring Trophy and won the junior silver medal.

Bell won the silver medal in the junior division of the 2013 U.S. Championships, behind Polina Edmunds.

2013–14 season 
During the 2013–14 season, Bell was coached by Cindy Sullivan in Westminster, Colorado. Making her ISU Junior Grand Prix debut, she won a bronze medal in Mexico and finished seventh in Poland. At the 2014 U.S. Championships, Bell finished thirteenth. Soon after her high school graduation in 2014, she moved to Monument, Colorado so that she could train under Kori Ade.

2014–15 season 
Bell's senior international debut came in the 2014–15 season. She competed at two ISU Challenger Series events, the 2014 Nebelhorn Trophy where she finished fifth, and the 2014 Golden Spin of Zagreb where she placed eighth. She finished sixth at the 2015 U.S. Championships, having ranked twelfth in the short program and 6th in the free skate.

2015–16 season 
In 2015–16, Bell started her season on the ISU Challenger Series (CS), placing sixth at the 2015 U.S. International Classic and 13th at the 2015 Ondrej Nepela Trophy.

Making her Grand Prix debut, Bell finished 8th at 2015 Skate America, scoring personal bests in the free skate and combined total score. She placed eleventh at the 2016 U.S. Championships.

2016–17 season 

Bell changed coaches in August 2016, joining Rafael Arutyunyan in Lakewood, California. She landed on the podium at two of her 2016–17 ISU Challenger Series assignments. Ranked second in both segments, she took silver at the 2016 CS U.S. International Classic, behind Satoko Miyahara. At the 2016 CS Ondrej Nepela Memorial, she placed fifth in the short, fourth in the free, and third overall behind Maria Sotskova and Yulia Lipnitskaya. She was invited to the 2016 Skate America to replace the injured Angela Wang. She won the silver medal behind Ashley Wagner after placing sixth in the short program and first in the free skate.

In January 2017, Bell received the bronze medal at the U.S. Championships, earning her a spot on the Four Continents and World teams. In February, she placed sixth at the 2017 Four Continents Championships in Gangneung, South Korea. She later placed twelfth at her first trip to the 2017 World Championships in Helsinki, Finland.

2017–18 season 
Bell began her season placing fifth at the U.S. International Figure Skating Classic behind teammates Mirai Nagasu and Karen Chen and was assigned to the Rostelecom Cup and the NHK Trophy on the 2017–18 ISU Grand Prix of Figure Skating circuit.

After a sixth-place finish at the 2017 Rostelecom Cup, Bell placed ninth at the 2017 NHK Trophy.

Bell was named as the second alternate to the 2018 Winter Olympics team after placing fifth at the 2018 U.S. Figure Skating Championships in San Jose.  On the withdrawal of Karen Chen, she was named to the 2018 World Figure Skating Championships team and placed twelfth.

2018–19 season 
Bell began the season at 2018 CS Nebelhorn Trophy, where she placed fourth overall with a score of 188.97. She was invited to 2018 Skate Canada International, where she placed fourth with a score of 190.25. In November, at 2018 NHK Trophy, she placed fifth overall with a score of 198.96, the highest in her career. She won the bronze medal at the 2018 CS Golden Spin after placing fourth in the short program and third in the free program, earning 196.60 points.

At the 2019 U.S. Championships, Bell underrotated the second part of her combination and placed third in the short program, behind Bradie Tennell and Alysa Liu.  She placed second in the free skate, behind Liu, winning the bronze medal overall, the second of her career.  Because the 13-year-old Liu was ineligible for senior (or even junior) international competition, Bell joined silver medalist Tennell on the American team for the 2019 World Championships, as well as the 2019 Four Continents Championships.

Bell placed third in the short program at Four Continents, setting a new personal best and winning a bronze small medal.  The free skate proved to be less successful, with a fall on a triple loop jump and a doubled Lutz, and she fell to sixth overall.

Bell finished ninth at the 2019 World Figure Skating Championships with a career-best total score of 208.07. Bell's attendance at the World Championships became enmeshed in controversy when she was accused of deliberately causing an on-ice incident in which the blade of her free leg hit South Korean skater Lim Eun-soo during a practice session, causing a cut on Lim's calf.  Lim's agency, All That Sports, stated to Agence-France Presse that the incident had been intentional and part of a pattern of bullying by Bell.  Upon request from the Korean Skating Federation, the International Skating Union conducted an investigation. On March 21, the ISU stated that it found no evidence that Bell had sought to injure Lim intentionally.  Rafael Arutyunyan, who coached both Bell and Lim, denied the allegations:  "The thing is that Mariah’s program includes an element where she lays her leg back and stretches it. This is how it happened that she touched Lim’s leg with her blade. Of course, it was not deliberately! There has never been any confrontation between them at training sessions." Bell later said: "The whole experience was really bizarre, and it just felt like I was drowning in this nightmare of completely false information that was put out there that I couldn't do anything about."

Bell concluded her season as part of the gold medal-winning Team USA at the 2019 World Team Trophy.

2019–20 season 

Having already had Adam Rippon collaborate as a choreographer the previous season, Bell added Rippon as part of her coaching team in addition to having him again choreograph her short program, this time to Britney Spears music on Rippon's recommendation.  Starting her season on the Challenger series at the 2019 CS Nebelhorn Trophy, Bell placed first in both segments to win the event, her first international gold medal.

For her first Grand Prix assignment, Bell competed at the 2019 Internationaux de France, placing third in the short program with only an unclear edge warning on her triple flip.  In the free skate, Bell underrotated a triple Lutz but otherwise landed all jumps cleanly and placed second in the segment, edging out reigning World and Olympic champion Alina Zagitova. She was third overall, behind Alena Kostornaia and Zagitova, taking her second Grand Prix medal. Bell said she was "proud of how this competition went."  Competing next at the 2019 Rostelecom Cup, Bell placed third in the short program despite falling on her jump combination. She was also third in the free skate, winning another bronze medal.

Bell placed third in the short program at the 2020 U.S. Championships when, after landing her jumps successfully, she fell in her step sequence. She remarked after, "today, maybe I felt a little too good."  Placing second in the free skate with no errors other than an underrotated triple Lutz, Bell won the silver medal and was the highest-finishing medalist eligible for senior international competition, the gold medal going again to Alysa Liu. Her free skate received a standing ovation, which she called "a very special feeling. I hadn’t had that before in my career."  Bell subsequently eschewed attending the Four Continents Championships in Seoul, looking ahead to the 2020 World Championships in Montreal, but these events were canceled as a result of the coronavirus pandemic.

2020–21 season 
After spending months off the ice in the midst of the pandemic, Bell resumed training in June 2020, stating that she hoped to use the time to work on developing a triple Axel, which she described as having "always been something that I believe that I can do." She competed at the first opportunity of the ISP Points Challenge, a virtual U.S. domestic competition, winning both segments of the competition, despite only doing one jump combination in the free skate. It was announced that she would be a virtual guest skater at the Japan Open.

Bell was assigned to compete at the 2020 Skate America event on the Grand Prix circuit, the ISU having made assignments based on training location due to the pandemic. Bell won the short program with a clean skate, more than three points ahead of Bradie Tennell in second place.  This would prove decisive, as she placed fourth in the free skate after falling on an underrotated triple Lutz and only attempting six triple jumps, but her short program score was sufficient to retain the overall lead and win her first Grand Prix gold medal.

Bell's success at Skate America and the prior season's national championships lead many to identify her as the favorite going into the 2021 U.S. Championships, particularly with defending champion Liu struggling with growth-related jumping limitations.  She unexpectedly placed third in the short program after underrotating her triple Lutz and called it a disappointment.  Bell struggled in the free skate, falling on a triple flip and making several other jump errors; as a result, she placed fifth in that segment and dropped to fifth place overall.

2021–22 season 
Heading into the Olympic season, Bell prepared new programs for the occasion. For the short program, she recruited RuPaul's Drag Race contestant Cordero Zuckerman to work with Adam Rippon on a stylistic homage to vogue set to the music of Lady Gaga. Her free skate to Joni Mitchell's "Both Sides Now", music Bell had considered using before, was meant to reflect the highs and lows of her career: "Skating to 'Hallelujah' at nationals was an incredible feeling — but I can still know what it was like the following year, to get off the ice and see myself in fifth." However, following her bronze medal showing at the Skating Club of Boston's Cranberry Cup international event and feedback from American officials, she subsequently dropped both programs, reviving her "Hallelujah" program and creating a new short program.

Bell's two Grand Prix assignments were the final two events of the series, starting with the 2021 Internationaux de France, where she placed sixth. She was tenth in the short program and fourth in the free skate. At her second event the following week, the 2021 Rostelecom Cup, Bell was third in the short program despite not landing a triple-triple combination, dropping to fourth after the free skate. She said, "technical content is a little bit lower right now, but I plan to put the triple-triple back in later during the season."

Bell entered the 2022 U.S. Championships as a contender for both the title and the American Olympic team. Frequent rival Bradie Tennell withdrew in advance due to injury. Bell won the short program, narrowly ahead of Karen Chen, while Alysa Liu was further back in third and withdrew before the free skate due to testing positive for COVID-19. Bell won the free skate as well, taking her first national title. The following day, she was named to the Olympic team, along with Chen and Liu. At 25, Bell became the oldest U.S. women's champion since Beatrix Loughran in 1927, and also the oldest American women's singles skater sent to the Olympics since Loughran in 1928.

Competing at the 2022 Winter Olympics in the women's event, Bell fell on her opening triple-triple combination attempt but nevertheless qualified for the free skate in eleventh position. She moved up one place in the free skate to finish tenth overall.

Days after the Olympics concluded, Vladimir Putin ordered an invasion of Ukraine, as a result of which the International Skating Union banned all Russian and Belarusian skaters from competing at the 2022 World Championships. This had a major impact on the women's field, dominated by Russians for most of the preceding eight years, and Bell entered the event as a podium contender. She finished third in the short program with a new personal best score of 72.55, taking a bronze small medal, the first for an American at the World Championships since Ashley Wagner in 2016. In the free skate, Bell struggled on both of her triple Lutzes in the second half of the program, underrotating one of them. She dropped from third to fourth overall, behind Liu.

Retirement 
On October 12, 2022, Bell announced on Instagram that she was retiring from competitive figure skating and said she would continue performing at ice shows.

Programs

Competitive highlights 

GP: Grand Prix; CS: Challenger Series; JGP: Junior Grand Prix

2011–12 to Present

2008–09 to 2010–11

Detailed results

Senior level 

Small medals for short and free programs awarded only at ISU Championships. At team events, medals awarded for team results only. ISU personal best scores highlighted in bold.

References

External links
 

1996 births
Living people
American female single skaters
People from Monument, Colorado
People from Westminster, Colorado
Sportspeople from Tulsa, Oklahoma
21st-century American women
Figure skaters at the 2022 Winter Olympics
Olympic figure skaters of the United States
20th-century American women